The 1977 San Diego State Aztecs football team represented San Diego State University during the 1977 NCAA Division I football season as an independent.

The team was led by head coach Claude Gilbert, in his fifth year, and played home games at San Diego Stadium in San Diego, California. They finished the season ranked #16 in the AP Poll and #18 in the UPI Poll, with a record of ten wins and one loss (10–1).

Schedule

Team players in the NFL
The following were selected in the 1978 NFL Draft.

Team awards

Notes

References

San Diego State
San Diego State Aztecs football seasons
San Diego State Aztecs football